Coritiba Foot Ball Club is a football club based in Curitiba, Paraná that competes in the Campeonato Brasileiro Série A, the most senior football league in Brazil.  Since its founding in 1909, the club has had 37 different presidents.

List of presidents 
Below is the official presidential history of Coritiba F.C., from when João Viana Seiler until Vilson Ribeiro de Andrade, the current president.

See also 
 Coritiba Foot Ball Club
 Campeonato Brasileiro de 1985

References 
 Coritiba FC

Coritiba Foot Ball Club